The South East Hockey League was a minor ice hockey league formed in August 2003. It succeeded the short-lived Atlantic Coast Hockey League and had 4 teams for its first and only season. Jim Riggs was the commissioner.

The Huntsville Channel Cats were the 2003–2004 President's Championship Cup winners. The Channel Cats defeated the Knoxville Ice Bears in three straight games in the championship series.

For the 2004–2005 season, the SEHL ceased play when two of its teams folded while the other two joined with teams from the World Hockey Association 2 to form the Southern Professional Hockey League.

Teams
 Huntsville Channel Cats (folded; SPHL had an expansion team in the city)  
 Knoxville Ice Bears (moved to SPHL)
 Cape Fear Fire Antz (moved to SPHL as Fayetteville FireAntz)
 Tupelo T-Rex (never played due to contractual issues with the Central Hockey League)
 Winston-Salem T-Birds (folded; SPHL had an expansion team in the city)

2003–2004 season

Regular season

Playoffs

Semifinals
Huntsville received a bye into the final.

Final

Awards

References

See also
List of developmental and minor sports leagues
List of ice hockey leagues

 
Defunct ice hockey leagues in the United States
2003–04 in American ice hockey by league